Dead Alive! is a live album by the Misfits. It was released on February 5, 2013 by Misfits Records. Album artwork was provided by Jason Edmiston.

Track listing
 "The Devil's Rain"
 "Vivid Red"
 "Land of the Dead"
 "Curse of the Mummy's Hand"
 "Cold in Hell"
 "Dark Shadows"
 "Death Ray"
 "Shining"
 "American Psycho"
 "Dig Up Her Bones"
 "Scream!"
 "Helena"
 "Science Fiction/Double Feature"
 "Saturday Night"

Personnel
 Jerry Only - vocals, bass guitar
 Dez Cadena - vocals, guitar
 Eric "Chupacabra" Arce - drums

References

Misfits (band) live albums
2013 live albums